Esther Mullin Harrison (June 10, 1946 – June 10, 2015) was an American politician.

Born in Columbus, Mississippi, Harrison went to Mississippi University for Women and Alcorn State University. Harrison was a teacher and an administrator in minority business. She was a member of the Mississippi House of Representatives from the 41st District, serving from 2000 to 2015. She was a member of the Democratic party. She died in office on her 69th birthday in 2015 at a Memphis hospital.

References

1946 births
2015 deaths
Democratic Party members of the Mississippi House of Representatives
Women state legislators in Mississippi
People from Columbus, Mississippi
Alcorn State University alumni
Mississippi University for Women alumni
21st-century American women